Ovenna is a genus of moths in the subfamily Arctiinae.

Species
 Ovenna agonchae Plötz, 1880
 Ovenna guineacola Strand, 1912
 Ovenna hailesellassiei Birket-Smith, 1965
 Ovenna simplex Birket-Smith, 1965
 Ovenna simulans Mabille, 1878
 Ovenna vicaria Walker, 1854

References

Natural History Museum Lepidoptera generic names catalog

Lithosiini